Waldbaum's was a supermarket chain with stores in the New York City boroughs of Brooklyn, Queens, Staten Island, and the Bronx; and in Nassau, Suffolk counties and Upstate New York.  The chain also for a time operated stores in New Jersey, Connecticut, and Massachusetts. Founded in 1904, Waldbaum's was one of seven "banner store chains" owned and operated by The Great Atlantic & Pacific Tea Company (A&P), which acquired the chain from its founding family in 1986.

Waldbaum's operated full-service traditional supermarkets with varying footprints and store models and its popular marquee in certain aisles along with good food and reliable service. At its peak in the 1980s, it was the 12th largest supermarket chain in the United States and had 140 stores throughout the New York metropolitan area. All Waldbaum's stores featured fresh meats and produce. 62 stores had bakeries and 36 offered pharmacy service. As with other A&P-branded stores, Waldbaum's offered in-house products under the America's Choice, America's Choice Kids, America's Choice Gold, Two-Forks Bakery, Green Way, Via Roma, Food Basics, Home Basics, Great Atlantic Seafood Market, Mid-Atlantic Country Farms,  Woodson & James, Hartford Reserve, Food Emporium Trading Co., Preferred Pet and Live Better brands.

History
In 1904, two brothers, Sam and Wolf Waldbaum, Jewish immigrants from the Galician region of Ukraine, opened a store in Brooklyn. Their nephew, Israel "Izzy" Waldbaum, came to America and joined the business. The three men ran the store, with Izzy taking over the grocery when his uncles retired. Izzy married Julia Leffel; they had three children. When Izzy died in 1948, his son Ira took over the then existing six stores in Brooklyn. Julia Waldbaum played an active part in the company and served as its secretary. From the 1960s onward, her picture and her recipes appeared on almost all of the company's 400 private-label products.

The company made history in 1938, when identical twin black brothers, Ernest and George Brown, who started working at one of the only two existing stores at the time as stockboys were promoted to checkout boys. "It was unheard of then for a colored checker to be in a white neighborhood," Ernest Brown said three decades later in an interview. Both Browns later became store managers and, eventually, Waldbaum executives (vice-president and assistant vice-president, respectively).

Expansion
Following the death of his father, Ira Waldbaum left his studies at New York University to run the family business.  By 1951, the company had opened its first supermarket in Flushing, Queens and net sales reached $55.2 million by 1960. In 1961, the company went public by selling shares of common stock.

A&P mismanaged Waldbaum's, investing little in these stores, resulting in the closing or sale of many Foodmart stores in the New England division. A&P then converted the remaining Waldbaum's Foodmart store into the Super Foodmart banner, and later, to A&P Super Foodmart (A&P's other New England division). The remaining forty-one Waldbaum's stores existed only in Brooklyn, Queens, Staten Island, and on Long Island. Many Waldbaum's are former A&P stores.

On August 13, 2010, A&P announced that it would close twenty-five stores as the parent of Waldbaum's began the implementation and execution phase of its comprehensive turnaround; these stores closed in October 2010, including stores in Centereach and Levittown, Long Island.

In February 2011, A&P announced thirty-two additional store closings, including three Long Island Waldbaum's: Farmingdale, Smithtown, and Valley Stream on April 15, 2011. In January 2012, A&P announced half a dozen additional closings on Long Island. The grocery chain said that six stores would close in Commack, West Babylon, East Islip, Lake Ronkonkoma, Huntington Station and Rockville Centre. The closures happened in March 2012, as Waldbaum's parent company, A&P, Inc. emerged from Chapter 11 bankruptcy protection.

On July 20, 2015, A&P filed for a pre-packaged Chapter 11 bankruptcy, following years of financial loss and a struggle to compete with rival grocery chains. The company announced that 3 Waldbaum's stores in Carle Place, Riverhead, and Oceanside were set to close. Nineteen stores were sold to Stop & Shop and Key Food. Five store locations were purchased by Best Yet Market in November 2015, and three locations to Wakefern Food Corporation, owner of the ShopRite Food chain.

1978 fire
At approximately 8:15a.m. on August 2, 1978, a fire was reported at the store in Sheepshead Bay, Brooklyn.  Workers who were in the store during renovations reported a fire near the compressor room. After several more calls, including a nearby pulled street box, several fire companies had been dispatched to the scene.  As a result of the renovations, the fire was able to quickly spread to the mezzanine and cockloft areas.  Per department policies at the time, firefighters were ordered to the roof to begin venting the building. After a determination made by the battalion chief on scene that day, a second alarm was ordered and the fire was declared as out of control.  At 9:02a.m., as firefighters were on the roof with fire showing in sections, a large portion suddenly collapsed, sending twelve firefighters into the fully involved building. In the end, six firefighters had died in the fire and over 30 injured.

Investigators initially  determined that the fire was deliberately set and arrested a 21-year old neighborhood man named Eric Jackson-Knight, who was charged with arson and six counts of murder for the loss of the firefighters. Jackson-Knight was convicted based on testimony from a Rikers Island inmate at the facility during the time Jackson-Knight was being held there; he also confessed to setting the fire with accomplices, but the methods he claimed to use were inconsistent with the characteristics of the fire and that he actually was describing another fire he had set earlier. Nonetheless, the jury voted to convict him and he was sentenced to twenty-five years to life in state prison; the verdict was affirmed on appeal in 1985 after Jackson-Knight motioned for a dismissal. However, as a civil suit filed by the families of the fallen firefighters was about to be drawn up in 1986 evidence emerged that upon further review the fire was caused by an electrical failure and that the prosecution withheld information from the defense team. In 1988, a new trial was ordered and in 1994 the jury returned an acquittal.

Bankruptcy and closure

A&P, the parent company of Waldbaum's, declared Chapter 11 bankruptcy in July 2015. All Waldbaum's stores were sold or closed by November 2015.

See also
Joseph Waldbaum

References

External links
A&P corporate website

Companies based in Bergen County, New Jersey
Defunct supermarkets of the United States
American companies established in 1904
Retail companies established in 1904
Retail companies disestablished in 2015
Supermarkets of the United States
The Great Atlantic & Pacific Tea Company
1904 establishments in New York City
2015 disestablishments in New York (state)
Companies that filed for Chapter 11 bankruptcy in 2010
Companies that filed for Chapter 11 bankruptcy in 2015